Bacterial binding protein-dependent transport systems, are multicomponent systems typically composed of a periplasmic substrate-binding protein, one or two reciprocally homologous integral inner-membrane proteins and one or two peripheral membrane ATP-binding proteins that couple energy to the active transport system. The integral inner-membrane proteins translocate the substrate across the membrane. It has been shown, that most of these proteins contain a conserved region located about 80 to 100 residues from their C-terminal extremity. This region seems  to be located in a cytoplasmic loop between two transmembrane domains. Apart from the conserved region, the sequence of these proteins is quite divergent, and they have a variable number of transmembrane helices, however they can be classified into seven families which have been respectively termed: araH, cysTW, fecCD, hisMQ, livHM, malFG and oppBC.

References

ATP-binding cassette transporters
Protein families